Robert Fletcher may refer to:

Robert Fletcher (writer), 16th-century English verse writer
Robert Fletcher (East India Company officer) (c. 1738–1776)
Robert Fletcher (priest) (1850–1917), Archdeacon of Blackburn
Robert Fletcher (politician) (1863–1918), New Zealand politician of the Liberal Party
Robert Virgil Fletcher (1869–1960), justice of the Supreme Court of Mississippi
Horace Fletcher (footballer) or Robert Fletcher (1876–1931), English football forward
Robert Fletcher (poet) (1885–1972), uncredited lyricist to Cole Porter's "Don't Fence Me In"
Robert Fletcher (costume designer) (1922–2021), costume and set designer
Robert A. Fletcher (fl. 1950s–2000s), illustrator and artist
Robert Emmett Fletcher (1911–2013) Farmer who helped interned Japanese during WWII

See also